Henjo Oliver Richter, (born 24 November 1963 in Hamburg, West Germany) is a guitarist and keyboardist in Gamma Ray, the German power metal band formed by Kai Hansen.

Biography
Henjo is a self-taught musician and started playing at the age of 13. He is a veteran of the German heavy metal scene, but Gamma Ray is his first major band. He joined them as a replacement for guitarist Dirk Schlächter (who had switched instrument to bass) on Somewhere Out in Space (1997). However, in the mid-1980s, Henjo was a member of the heavy metal band Rampage, replacing Roland Grapow.

In 2001, Henjo was hired by Tobias Sammet to be the guitarist of his metal opera project Avantasia .

In 2017, it was announced on Gamma Ray's website that the debut album of 'The Unity', which Richter founded together with Michael Ehré, was to be released in spring 2017.

Injuries
In 2005, Henjo was forced to miss part of Gamma Ray's tour for their album Majestic after injuring himself falling down a set of stairs on the ferry going between Sweden and Finland.

Kasperi Heikkinen replaced Henjo Richter for shows scheduled in Germany and Czech Republic in March 2010 because Henjo was hospitalized on 16 March 2010 due to retinal detachment.

In 2011, he had a biking accident and broke three ribs and his collarbone.

Discography

With Rampage
Love Lights Up the Night (1983)

With Gamma Ray
Somewhere Out in Space (1997)
Power Plant (1999)
Blast from the Past (compilation album) (2000)
No World Order (2001)
Skeletons in the Closet (live album) (2003)
Majestic (2005)
Land of the Free II (2007)
Hell Yeah! The Awesome Foursome (live album) (2008)
To the Metal (2010)
Skeletons & Majesties (EP) (2011)Skeletons & Majesties Live (live album) (2012)Empire of the Undead (2014)The Best (Of) (compilation album) (2015)

With AvantasiaThe Metal Opera (2000)The Metal Opera Part II (2002)

With The UnityThe Unity (2017)Rise (2018)

As a guest
 Freedom Call – Taragon (EP) (1999)
 Avantasia – The Scarecrow (2008) 
 Avantasia – Angel of Babylon (2010)
 Avantasia – The Flying Opera (live album) (2011) 
 War Kabinett – Made in Mexico (2011)
 Neopera – Destined Ways'' (2014)

References

External links
 Profile on official Gamma Ray website

German heavy metal guitarists
German male guitarists
1963 births
Living people
Musicians from Hamburg
Gamma Ray (band) members